Lavandula rotundifolia is a species of flowering plants of the family Lamiaceae. The species is endemic to Cape Verde. The species was named by George Bentham in 1833. Its local name is aipo.

Distribution and ecology
Lavandula rotundifolia occurs on the islands of Santo Antão, São Vicente, São Nicolau, Santiago and Fogo.

References

Further reading

rotundifolia
Endemic flora of Cape Verde
Flora of Santo Antão, Cape Verde
Flora of São Vicente, Cape Verde
Flora of São Nicolau, Cape Verde
Flora of Santiago, Cape Verde
Flora of Fogo, Cape Verde